In triangle geometry, an inellipse is an ellipse that touches the three sides of a triangle. The simplest example is the incircle. Further important inellipses are the Steiner inellipse, which touches the triangle at the midpoints of its sides, the Mandart inellipse and Brocard inellipse (see examples section). For any triangle there exist an infinite number of inellipses.

The Steiner inellipse plays a special role: Its area is the greatest of all inellipses.

Because a non-degenerate conic section is uniquely determined by five items out of the sets of vertices and tangents, in a triangle whose three sides are given as tangents one can specify only the points of contact on two sides. The third point of contact is then uniquely determined.

Parametric representations, center, conjugate diameters 

The inellipse of the triangle with vertices 

and points of contact

 
where  are uniquely determined by the choice of the points of contact:

The  third point of contact is

The center of the inellipse is

The vectors
 
 
are two conjugate half diameters and the inellipse has the more common trigonometric  parametric representation
 

The Brianchon point  of the inellipse (common point  of the lines ) is

Varying  is an easy option to prescribe the two points of contact . The given bounds for  guarantee that the points of contact are located on the sides of the triangle. They provide for  the bounds .

Remark: The parameters  are neither the semiaxes of the inellipse nor the lengths of two sides.

Examples

Steiner inellipse
For  the points of contact  are the midpoints of the sides and the inellipse is the Steiner inellipse (its center is the triangle's centroid).

Incircle
For 
one gets the incircle of the triangle with center

Mandart inellipse
For 
the inellipse is the Mandart inellipse of the triangle. It touches the sides at the points of contact of the excircles (see diagram).

Brocard inellipse
For  
one gets the Brocard inellipse. It is uniquely determined by its Brianchon point given in trilinear coordinates .

Derivations of the statements 

New coordinates
For the proof of the statements one considers the task projectively and introduces convenient new inhomogene --coordinates such that the wanted conic section appears as a hyperbola and the points  become the points at infinity of the new coordinate axes.
(Below it will turn out, that  have indeed the same meaning introduced in the statement above.) Now a hyperbola with the coordinate axes as asymptotes is sought, which touches the line . This is an easy task. By a simple calculation one gets the hyperbola with the equation . It touches the line  at point .

Coordinate transformation
The transformation of the solution into the x-y-plane will be done using homogeneous coordinates and the matrix
.
A point  is mapped onto

A point  of the  --plane is represented by the column vector  (see homogeneous coordinates).

Coordinate transformation of essential points

 
(see above.)

Their points of contact are

Because the ellipse tangents at points  are parallel, the chord  is a diameter and its midpoint the center   of the ellipse

One easily checks, that  has the --coordinates

One gets 
. And in x-y-coordinates:

From the two conjugate diameters  there can be retrieved the two vectorial conjugate half diameters 
 
and at least the trigonometric parametric representation of the inellipse:

Analogously to the case of a Steiner ellipse one can determine semiaxes, eccentricity, vertices, an equation in x-y-coordinates and the area of the inellipse.

The Brianchon point of the inellipse is the common point  of the three lines . In the --plane these lines have the equations: . Hence point  has the coordinates:

Transforming the hyperbola  yields the rational parametric representation of the inellipse:

Incircle

(1) Additionally 
(2).  (see diagram)
Solving these two equations for  one gets
(3)
In order to get the coordinates of the center one firstly calculates using (1) und (3)

Hence

Mandart inellipse
The parameters  for the Mandart inellipse can be retrieved from the properties of the points of contact (see de: Ankreis).

Brocard inellipse
The Brocard inellipse of a triangle is uniquely determined by its Brianchon point given in trilinear coordinates . Changing the trilinear coordinates into the more convenient representation  (see trilinear coordinates) yields . On the other hand, if the parameters  of an inellipse are given, one calculates from the formula above for : .

Inellipse with the greatest area 
The Steiner inellipse has the greatest area of all inellipses of a triangle.

Proof
From Apollonios theorem on properties of conjugate semi diameters  of an ellipse one gets:

 (see article on Steiner ellipse).

For the inellipse with parameters  one gets

where . 
In order to omit the roots, it is enough to investigate the extrema of function :

Because  one gets from the exchange of s and t:

Solving both equations for s and t yields
 which are the parameters of the Steiner inellipse.

See also 
 Circumconic and inconic

References

External links 
Darij Grinberg: Über einige Sätze und Aufgaben aus der Dreiecksgeometrie
 Circumconic at MathWorld
 Inconic at MathWorld

Conic sections
Curves defined for a triangle